Lorraine Marie Sheehan (née Cantin; May 2, 1937 – December 19, 2009) was the 63rd Secretary of State of Maryland and a member of the Maryland State House of Delegates, representing part of Prince George's County, Maryland.

Sheehan was born in Manchester, New Hampshire and moved to Maryland in 1965. After her son was diagnosed with disabilities, Sheehan became active in advocating for disability rights.

Sheehan was elected to the Maryland State House of Delegates in 1974, representing the 26th district in Prince George's County. She was re-elected in 1978 and again in 1982, in the new 25th district.

Sheehan was appointed by Governor Harry Hughes to be Secretary of State of Maryland in 1983, serving a four-year term.

After her career in public service, Sheehan moved to Anne Arundel County, Maryland and remained active in disability issues, becoming president of the Arc of the United States. She was inducted into the Maryland Women's Hall of Fame in 2002 and was the 2009 Advocate of the Year for the Anne Arundel Disability Commission.

Sheehan died of pneumonia complicated by cystic fibrosis on December 19, 2009, at Johns Hopkins Hospital.

References

Members of the Maryland House of Delegates
Secretaries of State of Maryland
1937 births
2009 deaths
Women state legislators in Maryland
20th-century American politicians
20th-century American women politicians
21st-century American women